Bradley Edward Davis (born December 29, 1982) is an American former professional baseball catcher, who played in Major League Baseball for the Florida Marlins in 2010.

Early life
Davis graduated from Capistrano Valley High School in Mission Viejo, California in 2001, where he was named CIF Player of the Year as a senior. He attended Long Beach State University, where he majored in Communications, and was also named as a Freshman All-American. In 2002, he played collegiate summer baseball with the Brewster Whitecaps of the Cape Cod Baseball League.

Professional career

Florida Marlins
Davis was drafted by the Marlins in the fifth round of the 2004 Major League Baseball Draft.  Davis spent all of 2006 with the Class-A Advanced Jupiter Hammerheads, and he went on to hit .259 with four home runs and 46 RBI in 106 games. He was honored by being named to represent Jupiter in the Florida State League All-Star Game. He had seven three-hit games and seven three-RBI games, including four games with three hits and three RBI.  His best month was August, when he batted .302 (19x63) with one home run and twelve RBI in twenty-one games.

On July 21, 2010, the Marlins designated Nate Robertson for assignment and promoted Davis to the major leagues.  He was optioned back to Triple-A on August 5, but he was recalled on August 20 after Ronny Paulino was suspended for the use of performance-enhancing drugs.

He was designated for assignment on June 15, 2011.

San Diego Padres
Davis signed a minor league contract with the San Diego Padres in 2012 but was released by the end of June after playing 39 games with their triple-a team in Tucson.

Miami Marlins
On July 5, 2012, Davis signed a minor league contract with the Miami Marlins but was released after only 7 games in their minor league system.

Detroit Tigers
On July 26, 2012, the Detroit Tigers signed a minor league contract with Davis.

References

External links

1982 births
Living people
Baseball players from San Diego
Jamestown Jammers players
Greensboro Grasshoppers players
Jupiter Hammerheads players
Carolina Mudcats players
Albuquerque Isotopes players
Jacksonville Suns players
New Orleans Zephyrs players
Tucson Padres players
Long Beach State Dirtbags baseball players
Brewster Whitecaps players
Florida Marlins players
Toledo Mud Hens players
Alaska Goldpanners of Fairbanks players